Sunny Bay is an MTR station in Yam O. It is between  and  stations. The station was originally to be named Yam O. Yam O was not used probably because of its ominous connotations (Cantonese Yam is more commonly known to English speakers as Mandarin yin, which means darkness or a negative quality. Yam O is yin since it is at the north side of a mountain).

The station was the first MTR station to have automatic platform gates (APG) installed on the edge of its platforms. In line with ground level and above-ground MTR stations, the Sunny Bay and  stations are not air conditioned, and rely on their open architecture to keep the temperature low.

Services to the station commenced on 1 June 2005. The transfer facilities to the  opened on 1 August that year. The livery of the station is slate grey. Platforms 1 (Tung Chung line towards Tung Chung) and 3 (Disneyland Resort line) are located opposite to each other to allow easy interchange of trains for passengers travelling from the urban areas. Architecture firm Aedas was the architect for the Disneyland Resort line and the architect for the Sunny Bay and Disneyland Resort stations.

The station is primarily used by tourists travelling to Hong Kong Disneyland who use the station to interchange from the Tung Chung line onto the Disneyland Resort line, but also provides bus transport links to the Hong Kong–Zhuhai–Macau Bridge and Discovery Bay.

The  passes through the centre of the station without stopping. This station is equipped with emergency platforms for the Airport Express.



History 
The Tung Chung Line began operations on 22 June 1998, shortly followed by the Airport Express two weeks later on 6 July. However, Sunny Bay station was not built at the time.

On 1 June 2005, in order to prepare for the opening of the Hong Kong Disneyland Resort, Sunny Bay station was opened initially for the staff of the resort. Two months later, on 1 August 2005, Disneyland Resort line also opened to the public.

Station layout 

Passengers travelling from Hong Kong can disembark and board Disneyland Resort trains departing from the opposite platform. Passengers returning from Disneyland Resort must cross a footbridge to reach platform 2 to board Tung Chung line trains heading towards Hong Kong. The exit gates are located on the same level and on the same side of the rail tracks as Platform 2.

Entrance/exit 

A: Transport interchange

Situated in reclaimed land near Yam O, the area is uninhabited and the sole exit leads to an emergency car park and transport interchange. As of 2005, the interchange is solely used by residents of Discovery Bay as the only bus routes run from the interchange to Discovery Bay, and as of late 2018, local passengers use this station in order to change for border route B5 (operated by Citybus) in order to change for buses to Macau and Zhuhai.

See also
Rail transport in Walt Disney Parks and Resorts

References

MTR stations in the New Territories
Tung Chung line
Disneyland Resort line
Yam O
Tsuen Wan District
Railway stations in Hong Kong opened in 2005